The Seven Wonders of Russia as determined by a project organized by the newspaper Izvestia, Radio Mayak, and the television channel Russia. The competition took place in three stages from 1 October 2007 through 1 June 2008, with the final results declared in Moscow's Red Square on 12 June 2008.

Seven Wonders of Russia

See also
 Wonders of the World (disambiguation)
 Wonders of the World
 Seven Natural Wonders of Ukraine

References

External links
 Manpupuner Rock Formations

Tourist attractions in Russia
Russian culture
Seven Wonders